Woodbridge is a very large suburban community in Vaughan, Ontario, Canada, along the city's border with Toronto. It occupies the city's entire southwest quadrant, west of Highway 400, east of Highway 50, north of Steeles Avenue, and generally south of Major Mackenzie Drive. It was once an independent town before being amalgamated with nearby communities to form the city in 1971. Its traditional downtown core is the Woodbridge Avenue stretch between Islington Avenue and Kipling Avenue north of Highway 7.

History

 
 

The community had its origins with the British Crown granting the west half of lots six and seven, concession 7 of Vaughan Township to Jacob Philips and Hugh Cameron in 1802. Woodbridge had its beginnings in what is today Pine Grove. During the early half the 19th century, a school was built on Vaughan's eighth concession; and a flour mill and store flourished. A scattering of houses arose around Smith's mill (later Hayhoe Mills), Smith's mill later became known as Smithsville, and then Pine Grove. Another nearby settlement to the south, known as Brownsville, came into being around a mill run by John Brown on the Humber River on what is today Wallace Street in the original Woodbridge village. Woodbridge itself, however, did not begin to take the form of a settlement or village until the arrival of Rowland Burr in 1837.

The settlement was later named Burwick after its founder, but was changed again to Woodbridge in 1855 because there was already a settlement named Burwick in the province. It overtook, and later included, Pine Grove after it was incorporated in 1882. The name comes from the wooden bridge that crossed the Humber River as an entry point into town. The historic bridge was located close to what is today Islington Avenue and Langstaff Road, on Langstaff looking north. A replica bridge (c. 1930) was made out of concrete and remains close to the original bridge location and is accessible from Boyd Park and to the city maintenance facility. The bridge has been rebuilt as of 2016 and is now made of steel.

A major industry over time, Abell Agricultural Works opened in 1862 and had 200 employees by 1874, making steam-powered agricultural equipment. The Toronto, Grey and Bruce Railway arrived from Weston in 1870. This line was constructed as a narrow gauge railway through Caledon and completed to Owen Sound in 1873. Owing to financial difficulty, it was operated by the Grand Trunk Railway until 1883, when it was leased to the Canadian Pacific Railway. Conversion to standard gauge required realigning some of the track curves, particularly around Woodbridge. In 1908 this line was linked to the transcontinental route through Sudbury, with the original route between Bolton and Orangeville being abandoned in 1934.

By 1880, the settlement had two general stores, a carriage works, two churches, a school, two hotels, a library, two newspapers and a post office. As the population increased it was pressured by the citizens to add a post office so there would be no confusion with another settlement in Canada West. By 1882, Woodbridge had over a thousand residents and was incorporated as a village.

Woodbridge was also served by a branch of the Toronto Suburban Railway until the 1930s. The radial railway from Weston came in along the west side of the river, north of Humber Summit, after descending from its route along Albion Road and Kipling Avenue.

Construction of Highway 7 began in the 1920s, passing south of the business section via an underpass of the Canadian Pacific. At this time, the land around much of Woodbridge was agricultural. Slowly, rural homes were built in the surrounding area.

In the 1950s, Woodbridge experienced spillover growth from suburban Toronto. Later, many Italians that settled in Toronto neighbourhoods such as Little Italy, moved to the suburbs and exurbs, in particular Woodbridge. The suburban expansion began east of the Humber and East Humber and to the northeast. Prior to the expansion, the urban area was up to Kipling Avenue and to the Humber. It later expanded in the west up to present-day Martin Grove Road and north to northeast of Langstaff Road in the 1960s. It later expanded further north in the 1970s and 1980s. A drive-in theatre was situated on Langstaff Road east of Highway 27. Operating from 1967 to 1997, the site was developed for housing in 1998.

The housing developments in the west expanded north to Langstaff. Development continued in the central part of Woodbridge (including the transformation of older stores in the village into smaller units of housing) in the early 1980s and west to Highway 27 in the late 1980s and early 90s. Development extended north to just south of Rutherford Road in the 1980s and east up to Weston Road from Highway 7 to south of Rutherford Road and south to north of the present-day Highway 407. The industrial areas began appearing first to the west and then to the southwest and east.

After the aforementioned drive-in was closed, Martin Grove Road was extended northward through the former property to serve more developments. Woodbridge Highlands was formed in the northwest, east of Highway 27 in the 1990s. In 1994 housing developments reached to Rutherford and continued until 1996 except for the northeast and the southeastern part. The condominiums began construction and now appear between Woodbridge Avenue and the Humber. Sonoma Heights at Islington and Rutherford and the Vellore area at Weston and Rutherford have been developed. The Vellore area includes Vellore Village developed by builders such as Greenpark Homes, Aspen Ridge Homes and Remington Homes. The Vellore Woods area was developed by Arista Homes and Fieldgate Homes. Development in the west end of Woodbridge then followed with Weston Rd. and Rutherford becoming a major focal point for the building of additional residential units stretching north to Major Mackenzie. Land on both sides of Weston Road to Major Mackenzie were completely filled in.

Woodbridge Avenue between Islington Avenue and Kipling Avenue was once home to some of the historical buildings from the late 19th century in addition to newer 1920s–1960s buildings, but is rapidly being reconstructed. Two examples of a historic buildings include a Tinsmith Shop and Masonic Lodge (c. 1850) and the Burwick family home (from 1844 on Pine Street) that were moved to Black Creek Pioneer Village. Market Lane remains the commercial hub of this area, with several other shops and stores lining Woodbridge Avenue.

Woodbridge was chosen as the new location for a research based mental health facility, the OCD and Anxiety Clinic of Ontario. First of its kind, it offers specialized psychological care by offering case by case care, as opposed to a volume patient care model.

An F2 tornado tore through the city of Vaughan during the Southern Ontario Tornado Outbreak on 20 August 2009. The tornado also ripped up trees, flipped cars, and left thousands of people without power. No one was killed.

Geography
Situated in hilly terrain of the Humber River Valley, historic Woodbridge rests at an average elevation of 200 metres between Highway 27 and Pine Valley Drive. The terrain can be described as a series of rolling hills and valleys. There are numerous valley intersections that demonstrate the geography of the area, notably Highway 7 and Islington and Highway 27 and Rutherford.

The area was mainly farmland before the onset of suburbanization in the 1970s, but the residential communities are interspersed with forests along the Humber River and its eastern branch. Today, much of the area is residential with commercial and industrial properties to the south, close to Steeles Avenue and to the east near Pine Valley Drive.

The area commonly considered to be Woodbridge today covers a very large portion (roughly one-third) of Vaughan, and is usually seen as being bounded by Highway 50 or Highway 27 to the west, Steeles Avenue to the south, Highway 400 to the east, and Major Mackenzie Drive to the north.

Climate

Woodbridge has a humid continental climate (Köppen climate classification Dfb), with warm, humid summers and cold, snowy winters. Woodbridge winters feature cold snaps where maximum temperatures remain below −10 °C (14 °F), often made to feel colder by wind chill. Accumulating snow can fall any time from October until April. Summer in Woodbridge is characterized by long stretches of humid weather. Spring and autumn are transitional seasons, with generally mild or cool temperatures and alternating dry and wet periods. According to the USDA plant hardiness level, Woodbridge is 5a.

Surrounding communities
Kleinburg, N  
Maple, NE  
Concord, E  
Etobicoke, S (Toronto)
Claireville, W (Brampton)
Rexdale,S (Toronto)

Demographics

As of the 2021 census, the population of Woodbridge is 106,810, a 1.5% increase from the 105,228 population in 2016. As of the 2021 census, the top three ethnic groups in Woodbridge are Italian (49,660; 46.7%; which, until the most recent census, was the highest concentration in Canada, now second to Nobleton), East Indian (5,815; 5.5%), Canadian (5,655; 5.3%).

Attractions

Greenspace

Woodbridge is home to two natural preserves along the Humber River:
Boyd Conservation Area
Kortright Centre for Conservation
 Doctors McLean District Park
 Rainbow Creek Park
 Woodbridge Fairgrounds
 Fundale Park
 Maxey Park

Sites of interest
Market Lane
Memorial Hill with a tower
Pierre Berton Library
Boyd Conservation Area
Kortright Centre

Education
Blue Willow Public School
Dayley's Mills Public School
Padre Dave Cheapola
Emily Carr Secondary School
Father Bressani Catholic High School
Fossil Hill Public School
Elders Mills Public School
Holy Cross Catholic Academy
Immaculate Conception Catholic Elementary School
Lorna Jackson Public School
North Hill Private School
Our Lady of Fatima Catholic Elementary School
Pine Grove Public School
San Marco Catholic Elementary School
St. Agnes of Assisi Elementary School
St. Andrew Catholic Elementary School
St. Angela Merici Catholic Elementary School
St. Catherine of Siena Catholic Elementary School
St. Clare Catholic Elementary School
St. Clement Catholic Elementary School
St. Francis of Assisi Catholic Elementary School
St. Gabriel the Archangel Catholic Elementary School
St. Gregory the Great Academy
St. Jean de Brebeuf Catholic High School
St. Emily Catholic Elementary School
St. John Bosco Catholic Elementary School
St. Margaret Mary Catholic Elementary School
St. Padre Pio Catholic Elementary School
St. Peter Catholic Elementary School
St. Stephen Catholic Elementary School
Tommy Douglas Secondary School
Toronto District Christian High School
Vellore Woods Public School
Woodbridge College
Woodbridge Montessori School (Private Elementary)
Woodbridge Public School
Glenn Gould Public School
 St.Michael the Archangel Catholic Elementary

Notable people
Elizabeth Arden, founder of cosmetic company of the same name
Robert Barbieri, professional rugby player
Mark Bocek, UFC fighter
Jesse Carere, actor
Anthony Cirelli, hockey player
Andrew Cogliano, NHL player
Frank Corrado, NHL player
Chris DiDomenico, NHL player
Natalie Di Luccio, international multilingual singer
Sergio Di Zio, actor
Steve Eminger, AHL player
Danny Fernandes, singer
Mike Harris, 22nd premier of Ontario
Jimmy Jones, ice hockey right winger
Stephen Lecce, Ontario minister of education
Mike Liambas, NHL player
Marc Liegghio, Canadian Football League player
Victor Mete, NHL player
Steve Nease, cartoonist
Michael Petrasso, soccer player
Dina Pugliese, television personality
Marco Reda, professional soccer player
David Rocco, actor and television cooking show host
Vince Rocco, ice hockey player
Arthur Evans Snell, 10th Canadian Surgeon General
Marco Terminesi, soccer player

In popular culture
The song "The Woodbridge Dog Disaster" by Canadian folk singer Stan Rogers, detailing a fictional occurrence in the community, was recorded in the 1970s.

References

Neighbourhoods in Vaughan
Italian Canadian settlements